The Bayswater Road is a  minor street in the Kings Cross district of Sydney, New South Wales, Australia.

Route
From this point the street heads east over a short rise and down a hill towards  where, east of Ward Avenue and west of Roslyn Street, vehicular traffic in the street able to head in one way direction, from west to east only. At Roslyn Street, through traffic is not permitted, with all traffic directed north on Roslyn Street. East of the junction of Roslyn Street and Bayswater Road, southbound traffic on Roslyn Street is also directed one way, east, on Bayswater Road. From this point Bayswater Road merges with William Street and, adjacent to Rushcutters Bay Park, the street continues as New South Head Road.

History
The western end of the street is lined with nightspots, eateries, adult venues, dance clubs hotels, and is a popular destination for both Sydneysiders and tourists. It is considered to be a more upmarket precinct of Kings Cross, when compared with Darlingurst Road.

A busy electric tramway to Watsons Bay once ran down the thoroughfare, this was closed in 1960, replaced by buses.

See also

City of Sydney

References

Streets in Sydney
Kings Cross, New South Wales